Cerberilla ambonensis is a species of sea slug, an aeolid nudibranch, a marine heterobranch mollusc in the family Aeolidiidae.

Distribution
This species was described from Ambon Island, Indonesia.

Description
All Cerberilla species have a broad foot and the cerata are numerous, arranged in transverse rows across the body. In this species the edge of the foot has distinctive black or dark brown stripes at right angles to the margin. The cerata are brown with a yellow or orange band on the dorsal surface and the foot is translucent white. The long oral tentacles have a pale yellow band near the translucent base, then a bright blue band which changes to black and then to pale yellow and finally to a black tip. This is slightly different to Bergh's illustration which shows dark grey oral tentacles with yellow tips.

Ecology 
Species of Cerberilla live on and in sandy substrates where they burrow beneath the surface and feed on burrowing sea anemones.

References

 Cobb, G. & Willan, R.C. 2005. New records of nudibranchs (Gastropoda, Opisthobranchia) for Australia and for southern Queensland. Vita Malacologica 3: 61-68

Aeolidiidae
Gastropods described in 1905